Rudy Ramos (born September 19, 1950) is an American actor and musician, born and raised in Lawton, Oklahoma. His acting career has covered six decades. It started with an appearance on the television show Ironside in 1969. Six months later he was cast as a series regular on the television western The High Chaparral, playing the part of Wind. Some of his other TV roles include Hunter (1987–1988) and Yellowstone (2018–present).

His films include Helter Skelter (1976), The Enforcer (1976), The Driver (1978), Defiance (1980), Quicksilver (1986), Beverly Hills Cop II (1987), Colors (1988), Open House (1987).

During Native American Heritage Month in November 2020, Ramos was highlighted in a story by Hillary Atkin for the Television Academy Emmys.

Filmography and Television

References

External links
 

1950 births
20th-century American male actors
 Native American actors
21st-century American male actors
American male film actors
American male television actors
Living people